George Dennis Holmes, CB, FRSE (born 9 November 1926) is a British retired civil servant and forester.

Born on 9 November 1926, Holmes studied at the University of Wales. He entered the staff of the Forestry Commission in 1948 and became Director of Research in 1968 and then Commissioner for Harvesting and Marketing in 1973, serving in that post until his appointment as the commission's Director-General and Deputy Chairman in 1977 in succession to John Dickson. He retired in 1986. Holmes was credited with introducing policies and grants for landowners to encourage the rehabilitation of woods of broad-leaved trees, which proved popular with conservationists.

For his service, he was appointed a Companion of the Order of the Bath (CB) in the 1979 Birthday Honours. He was elected a Fellow of the Royal Society of Edinburgh in 1982.

References 

1926 births
Living people
Alumni of the University of Wales
British civil servants
British foresters
Companions of the Order of the Bath
Fellows of the Royal Society of Edinburgh